The Drama Desk Award for Outstanding Orchestrations is an annual award presented by Drama Desk in recognition of achievements in the theatre among Broadway, Off Broadway and Off-Off Broadway productions. This category was eliminated with the 2011–12 season, only to be reinstated about a week later due to popular and overwhelming demand from much of the Broadway community.

Winners and nominees

1980s

1990s

2000s

2010s

2020s

Multiple wins

 4 wins
 Jonathan Tunick

 3 wins
 William David Brohn

 2 wins
 Doug Besterman
 Larry Hochman
 Don Sebesky
 Danny Troob

See also
 Tony Award for Best Orchestrations

References

External links
 Drama Desk official website

Orchestrations